HMS Brocklesby is a  of the British Royal Navy, her primary purpose is to find and neutralise sea mines using a combination of; Sonar, Mine Clearance Divers and the Seafox remotely operated vehicle (ROV).  The class are the largest warships of glass-reinforced plastic (GRP) construction, which gives the vessels a low magnetic signature.  In addition to her mine countermeasures activities, Brocklesby acts as an offshore patrol vessel, undertaking coastal patrol and fisheries protection duties.

Operational history

Cherbourg incident
In 1993 she became involved in the Cherbourg incident, when Brocklesby challenged the French trawler La Calypso in the Channel Islands waters.

2003 Invasion of Iraq
She gained a battle honour when she was among the first coalition ships into Umm Qasr during the 2003 invasion of Iraq. She was part of a group of mine countermeasure vessels that cleared a mined channel into the port, enabling access to it by sea.

2011 Libya operations
In 2011 she took part in surveillance and embargo operations off the coast of Libya alongside , as part of Operation Ellamy, the UK's contribution to Operation Unified Protector. In early May 2011, she took part in a mine-clearing operation to secure the waters of Misrata Port, Libya, after mines were dropped by Muammar Gaddafi's forces to prevent aid from being delivered to the besieged city.

Brocklesbys commanding officer, Lieutenant Commander Jim Byron DSC, said:

Brocklesby returned to Portsmouth on 5 July 2011 flying a special version of the Jolly Roger, indicating the successful destruction of a sea-mine.

Exercise Joint Warrior 2013
In October 2013 she participated in Exercise Joint Warrior.

Operation Kipion 2018–2021
During 2018 Brocklesby departed the UK's waters and transited to the Middle East as part of the British commitment to promoting stability in the region. Operation Kipion saw four British minehunters, as well as other warships, spend approximately three years forward deployed. The squadron is capable of operating both independently and as part of a larger multinational force to ensure the safe flow of oil and trade from the Middle East. In August 2021, Middleton returned to the Gulf to again relieve Brocklesby which redeployed back to the U.K.

References

External links

Virtual tour of HMS Brocklesby in Bahrain on YouTube

 

Hunt-class mine countermeasures vessels
1982 ships